Mystery of the Nile is a 2005 IMAX film documenting the first successful expedition to navigate the entire length of the Blue Nile and Nile from its source in Ethiopia to the Mediterranean Sea.  The expedition was led by geologist Pasquale Scaturro.  The journey took 114 days starting on December 22, 2003 and was finished on April 28, 2004.  The film was released in 2005.

External links 
 http://www.nilefilm.com/ - official website

2005 films
2005 short documentary films
IMAX short films
Films set in Africa
Nile
Films shot in Ethiopia
Films shot in Sudan
Films shot in Egypt
IMAX documentary films
2000s English-language films
American short documentary films